The Corsican ( or) is a breed of small domestic horse indigenous to the Mediterranean island of Corsica, off the coast of south-eastern France. The breed was officially recognised in February 2012, more than thirty years after the process was begun. The stud-book is kept by a breeders' association, the Association Nationale de Race U Cavallu Corsu. The total population in the island is estimated at approximately 1000. Since the stud-book was established in 2012, about 100 animals have been registered.

Characteristics
The head is relatively short, sometimes heavy, with a straight profile. The body is compact, with a short and sloping croup. The legs are fine, with small hard hooves.

History
There are no equines in the fossil record of Corsica, and for that reason it is believed that humans brought the first horses to the island, along with a number of other animals. The Haras Nationaux set up a remount depot on the island in 1861 for the purpose of producing light cavalry horses and mules. When the military ceased to breed horses there, the animals remaining were bred by local people and reverted to a homogeneous phenotype due to what essentially became natural selection.

Uses
Today most Corsican horses are used for trail riding, primarily within the tourist industry. They are noted for toughness and endurance.

References

Horse breeds
Horse breeds originating in France